Thomas Vincent Faustus Sadler (1604–1681) was a Roman Catholic missionary in England and spiritual author.

Biography
Thomas Sadler was born in 1604, and received into the Catholic Church at the age of seventeen by his uncle, Dom Walter Sadler, and joined the Benedictines at Dieulward, being professed in 1622.
 
Little is known of his missionary work, but he was probably chaplain to the Sheldons of Weston and the Tichbornes in Hampshire before moving to London, where he worked for many years. He died at Dieulward, Flanders on 19 January 1681.

Works

He edited several spiritual books, often collaborating with Dom Anselm Crowther, and signed with the initials T.V.
 
His chief publications are
 The Christian Pilgrim in his Spiritual Conflict and Conquest (1652)
 Jesus, Maria, Joseph (1657)
 The Daily Exercise of the Devout Rosarists (1657), which was afterwards developed into a well-known prayer book, The Daily Exercise of the Devout Christian.
 A Guide to Heaven, translated from Giovanni Bona's Manuductio (1672)
 The Holy Desires of Death, translated from ?Louis Lallemant (1678).
 Wood attributes to him The Childe's Catechism (1678).

Notes

References

1604 births
Place of birth unknown
1681 deaths
Roman Catholic missionaries in England
English Benedictines
English Roman Catholic missionaries